Boxing at the 2019 Military World Games was held in Wuhan, China from 23 to 26 October 2019.

Medal summary

Men

Women

References 
 2019 Military World Games Results - Page 37

Military World Games
Boxing
2019
2019